David B. Hawk (born June 21, 1968) is a Tennessee politician. He was elected to the 103rd through the 113th General Assembly as the member of the Tennessee House of Representatives representing the 5th district, which is composed of Unicoi County and part of Greene County. He is a member of the Commerce Committee, the Conservation and Environment Committee, the Parks and Tourism Subcommittee, and the Small Business Subcommittee. David Hawk attended Tusculum College and graduated from East Tennessee State University with honors and a degree in Marketing, and worked as a haberdasher.

in 2020, Hawk made an unsuccessful bid for congress to represent the U.S. House to represent Tennessee's 1st Congressional District. He placed 7th with approximately five percent of the vote.

HB962 a.k.a. "Guns in Bars"
On May 7, 2009, Hawk voted to pass HB962 which would allow licensed gun owners to bring concealed weapons into bars, night clubs, and other establishments which serve alcohol. Hawk voted to allow the 222,000 permit holders  to bring firearms into bars, nightclubs, etc. provided that they don't drink.

Supporters of the bill cite the Second Amendment while those who oppose it share a variety of concerns ranging from public safety to increased operating costs.
Walt Baker, the CEO of the Tennessee Hospitality Association, which oversees hotels, motels, and restaurants states that this bill transfers the responsibility from the customer with the firearm to the owner of the establishment. He is also anticipating a hike in insurance costs and lawsuits.

Gov. Phil Bredesen vetoed to the bill stating that even though he supports the right to bear arms, he believes carrying "a concealed weapon into a crowded bar at midnight on a Saturday night defies common sense". Rep. Curry Todd, R-Collierville responded, "I won't tell you what the governor can do with that piece of paper he just sent".  Tennessee law only requires a simple majority to override a veto, so lawmakers think the override will pass easily.

Domestic violence charges 
Hawk was accused in December 2012 of Domestic Violence related to a domestic incident in which he allegedly hit his ex-wife. He spent the night in jail and was convicted of Reckless Endangerment and sentenced to 150 hours of community service, anger management classes and paid $1,500 in restitution. (2012)

References

External links
David Hawk's profile at the Tennessee General Assembly website
David Hawk's Ballotpedia

1968 births
Republican Party members of the Tennessee House of Representatives
East Tennessee State University alumni
Tusculum University alumni
Living people
21st-century American politicians
Tennessee politicians convicted of crimes